James Humphrey may refer to:

 James Humphrey (New York politician) (1811–1866), U.S. Representative from New York
 James Brown Humphrey (1859–1937), musician, bandleader, and music instructor in New Orleans, Louisiana
 James K. Humphrey, founder of the United Sabbath-Day Adventist Church, a small African American Christian denomination
 James M. Humphrey (1819–1899), also a U.S. Representative from New York
 James Humphrey (convict) (1832–1898), Australian convict and schoolteacher
 James Ellis Humphrey (1861–1897), American botanist and mycologist
 James H. Humphrey (1911–2008), educator and leader in the field of physical education

See also
James Humphreys (disambiguation)